Rianne de Vries (born 14 December 1990) is a Dutch short track speed skater.

Sporting career

Olympic Games
She was selected for the 3000 metre relay team at the 2014 Winter Olympics but didn't compete. She was also selected for the 3000 metre relay team at the 2018 Winter Olympics, but again did not compete.

World Championships
She competed in the 3000 metre relay event at the 2016 World Short Track Speed Skating Championships in Seoul, South Korea.

European Championships
De Vries competed at the 2017 European Short Track Speed Skating Championships in the 500-metre and 3000 metre relay events, winning a gold and bronze medal respectively.

Personal life
De Vries started speed skating when she was a child and started doing short track speed skating in 2009. In July 2017 she broke her right ankle during a training.

She studies Sport at the CIOS in Heerenveen.

Her partner is short track speed skater Daan Breeuwsma. He competed at the relay event at the 2014 Winter Olympics.

References

External links
 
 

1990 births
Living people
Dutch female short track speed skaters
World Short Track Speed Skating Championships medalists
Sportspeople from Heerenveen
Short track speed skaters at the 2022 Winter Olympics
Olympic short track speed skaters of the Netherlands
20th-century Dutch women
21st-century Dutch women